Molena is a city in Pike County, Georgia, United States. The population was 475 at the 2000 census.

History
Early variant names were "Snidersville" and "Jenkinsville". The Georgia General Assembly incorporated Molena as a city in 1905.

Geography

Molena is located at  (33.009860, -84.502152).

Demographics

As of the census of 2000, there were 475 people, 134 households, and 110 families residing in the city. The racial makeup of the city was 68.63% White, 30.74% African American, 0.42% from other races, and 0.21% from two or more races. Hispanic or Latino of any race were 1.68% of the population.

There were 134 households, out of which 42.5% had children under the age of 18 living with them, 64.2% were married couples living together, 12.7% had a female householder with no husband present, and 17.9% were non-families. 13.4% of all households were made up of individuals, and 5.2% had someone living alone who was 65 years of age or older.  The average household size was 3.06 and the average family size was 3.36.

In the city, the population was spread out, with 25.9% under the age of 18, 6.9% from 18 to 24, 26.1% from 25 to 44, 20.0% from 45 to 64, and 21.1% who were 65 years of age or older.  The median age was 38 years. For every 100 females, there were 76.6 males.  For every 100 females age 18 and over, there were 69.2 males.

The median income for a household in the city was $40,673, and the median income for a family was $41,818. Males had a median income of $31,875 versus $17,656 for females. The per capita income for the city was $12,369.  About 6.3% of families and 10.0% of the population were below the poverty line, including 13.3% of those under age 18 and none of those age 65 or over.

Education
Molena Public Schools are part of the Pike County School District. The school district has a pre-k - second grade building, one elementary school, one middle school, a ninth grade academy and a high school.

References

Cities in Georgia (U.S. state)
Cities in Pike County, Georgia